Sven Håkansson (14 November 1909 – 7 July 1997) was a Swedish long-distance runner who competed in the 1948 Summer Olympics.

References

1909 births
1997 deaths
Swedish male long-distance runners
Olympic athletes of Sweden
Athletes (track and field) at the 1948 Summer Olympics
20th-century Swedish people